The Indiabulls Group is an Indian conglomerate headquartered in Gurgaon, whose primary businesses are housing finance, consumer finance, and real estate. The Group also has a presence in wealth management, construction equipment rentals, pharmaceuticals and LED lighting.

History
Indiabulls Group started operations in 1999 as a financial services company.

In 2021, Groww acquired Indiabulls AMC, the mutual funds business of the group, for 175 crore.

Operations divisions

Listed companies 

Equity shares of the companies are listed on the Bombay Stock Exchange (BSE) and the National Stock Exchange (NSE). Its global depository receipts (GDRs) are listed on the Luxembourg Stock Exchange.
Indiabulls Housing Finance
Dhani Services (formerly Indiabulls Ventures)
Indiabulls Real Estate
 Indiabulls Enterprises (including Indiabulls Store One, Indiabulls LED, Indiabulls Pharmaceuticals)
 Yaarii Digital Integrated Services (formerly Indiabulls Integrated Services Ltd.)

References

External links

Companies based in Gurgaon
Financial services companies of India
Indian companies established in 2000
2000 establishments in Haryana
Financial services companies established in 2000
Conglomerate companies of India